Dar al-Ulum (kullīya dār al-ʿulūm "House of Sciences" ), is an educational institution designed to produce students with both an Islamic and modern secondary education. It was founded in 1871 and is now a faculty of Cairo University; it became commonly called Faculty of Dar al-Ulum.

The Faculty has 6 majors in Islamic studies, Arabic, and philosophy. Most of graduates work as teachers after getting required diploma from Faculty of Education.

Dar al-ʿUlum was incorporated into Cairo University in 1946 and is now referred to as “The Faculty of Dar al-ʿUlum.”  The Faculty is delegated by Cairo University to offer B.A., M.A., and Ph.D. degrees in Arabic language and literature & Islamic studies.

Notable alumni 

 Hassan al-Banna (1906-1949): Egyptian Islamic theorist and politician.
 Farouk Shousha (1936-2016): Egyptian poet and writer.
 Abdul Azim al-Deeb (1929-2010): Egyptian Islamic scholar.
 Sayyid Qutb (1906-1966): Egyptian author, educator, Islamic theorist, poet, and a leading member of the Egyptian Muslim Brotherhood in the 1950s and 1960s

See also 
 Darul uloom (disambiguation)

References

David C. Kinsey, “Efforts for Educational Synthesis under Colonial Rule: Egypt and Tunisia,” Comparative Education Review, Vol. 15, No. 2, Colonialism and Education. (Jun., 1971), pp. 172–187.Cited in Kinsey's article:
J. Heyworth-Dunne, An Introduction to the History of Education in Modern Egypt (London: Luzac, 1939);
Yacoub Artin, L'instruction publique en Egypte (Paris: Leroux, 1890);
Ahmad Izzat Abd al-Karim, Ta'rikh al-ta'lim fi Misr: 1848-1882, 3 vols. (Cairo: Dar al-Ma'arif, 1917);
Muhammad Abd al-Jawwad, Taqwim Dar al-ʿUlum (Cairo: Dar al-Ma'arif, 1952), p. 6;
Ibrahim Salama, L'enseignement islamique en Egypte (Cairo: Imprimerie nationale, 1939), p. 254;
Robert L. Tignor, Modernization and British Colonial Rule in Egypt, 1882-1914 (Princeton: Princeton University Press, 1966);
David C. Kinsey, "Egyptian Education Under Cromer: A Study of East-West Encounter in Educational Administration and Policy, 1883-1907" (Unpublished PhD dissertation, Harvard University, 1965);
Abu Al-Futouh Ahmad Radwan, Old and New Forces in Egyptian Education (N.Y: Teachers College, Columbia University, 1951);
Lord Cromer, Annual Report for 1906, House of Commons Sessional Papers, Egypt, No. I (1907) (London: HMSO, 1907), p. 94;
Douglas Dunlop, "Note on the Progress and Condition of Public Instruction in Egypt in 1913" (mimeographed, 1914), pp. 17–18;
Sir Eldon Gorst, Annual Report for 1907, House of Commons Sessional Papers, Egypt. No. I (1908) (London: HMSO, 1908), p. 39.

Education in Egypt
Educational institutions established in 1871
1871 establishments in Egypt
Cairo University